Vayyari Bhama is a 1953 Indian Telugu-language swashbuckler film, produced by Satrasala Lakshminarayana, P. Subba Rao under the Ajantha Pictures banner and directed by P. Subba Rao. It stars Akkineni Nageswara Rao, S. Varalakshmi and Sulochana Devi, with music composed by S. Rajeswara Rao. The film was released on 6 June 1953.

Plot 
Once upon a time, in a kingdom there lived a naughty guy called Chadraiah, his father gets annoyed with his deeds and exiled him from their house. Chadraiah leaves the village, on the way he meets a soldier who narrates to him a false story regarding a magical woman Vayyari Bhama who lives on an island that comes after crossing seven seas and she possesses a diamond through which a man can achieve anything in the universe. Chandraiah reaches the fort and reveals the secret to the King. The King has immense belief in these miracles and he promises Chandraiah that if his word comes true he is ready to give half of his kingdom along with his daughter Sudha. Jambalaya a Witchard magician to whom the king shows a lot of favoritism also provokes him. Even his chief minister objects to him that he is not ready to listen with the help of Jambalaya the king reaches an island where they meet an old sorceress Dhimdhim. She takes advantage of the king's innocence, converts her daughter Tara into Vayyari Bhama, and shows a fake diamond. The king takes them along with them and makes Tara his queen. But the chief minister has suspension on them. Meanwhile, Chandraiah and Sudha fall in love, he asks the king to fulfill his promise and he agrees. Here Tara is attracted to Chandraiah and gets jealous seeing his love for Sudha, so, she tries to lure Chandraiah but he does not yield. The next day, Sudha gets disappeared when a furor thing happens in the fort. Chandraiah is blamed for this deed and arrested. Tara again meets Chandraiah in the prison and asks him to fulfill her desire when Chief Minister observes her but she cleverly slips. The Chief Minister talks with Chandraiah and learns the truth. On the other side, the king misses Sudha, so, he decides to retrieve her through the diamond. He takes the diamond into his hand and hymns then Tara manages by telling him that the diamond has lost its power because he has touched it. Eventually, Sudha is left in a remote area, after facing so many troubles she reaches the fort but Dhimdhim hides her secretly. Now Tara and Dhimdhim misguide the king, they make him sacrifice Sudha to get back the diamond's power and with it, they can again make her alive. Meanwhile, they lie to Sudha that her marriage arrangements are being made with Chandraiah. Simultaneously, marriage & sacrifice arrangements for Sudha are made. The rest of the story is about what happens?

Cast 
Akkineni Nageswara Rao as Chandraiah
S. Varalakshmi as Sudha
Sulochana Devi as Tara / Vayyari Bhama
C.S.R as Maharaju
Vangara
Chadalavada
Gangarathnam
Surabhi Kamalabai
C. Krishnaveni
Annapurna

Soundtrack 
Music composed by S. Rajeswara Rao.

References

External links 
 

Films based on Indian folklore
Films scored by S. Rajeswara Rao
1950s Telugu-language films